The 1989–90 AHL season was the 54th season of the American Hockey League.

Fourteen teams played 80 games each in the schedule. The Sherbrooke Canadiens repeated finishing first overall in the regular season. The Springfield Indians won their sixth Calder Cup championship.

Final standings
Note: GP = Games played; W = Wins; L = Losses; T = Ties; GF = Goals for; GA = Goals against; Pts = Points;

Scoring leaders

Note: GP = Games played; G = Goals; A = Assists; Pts = Points; PIM = Penalty minutes

 complete list

Calder Cup playoffs

The league instituted trophies for division champions in the playoffs; the Richard F. Canning Trophy in the North Division, and the Robert W. Clarke Trophy in the South Division.

Trophy and award winners
Team awards

Individual awards

Other awards

See also
List of AHL seasons

References
AHL official site
AHL Hall of Fame
HockeyDB

 
AHL
AHL
American Hockey League seasons